The 1965 Bucknell Bison football team was an American football team that represented Bucknell University during the 1965 NCAA College Division football season. Bucknell won the championship of the Middle Atlantic Conference, University Division.

In their first year under head coach Carroll Huntress, the Bison compiled a 6–3 record. T. Geoffrey Traub was the team captain.

After winning their first two games, the Bison were ranked No. 18 in the UPI national College Division coaches poll, but lost that week to Penn and dropped out of the rankings. Despite recovering with a conference-winning record, they remained unranked through the end of the year.

Bucknell played its home games at Memorial Stadium on the university campus in Lewisburg, Pennsylvania.

Schedule

References

Bucknell
Bucknell Bison football seasons
Bucknell Bison football